The Women's Points Race was one of the 6 women's events at the 2003 UCI Track Cycling World Championships, held in Stuttgart, Germany.  Twenty cyclists from 20 countries participated in the race. Because of the number of entries, there were no qualification rounds for this discipline. Consequently, the event was run direct to the final.

Final
The Final and only race was run at 20:30 on July 30. The competition consisted on 84 laps, making a total of 24 km with 12 sprints.

Elapsed Time=32:17.640
Average Speed=44.590 km/h

References

Women's points race
UCI Track Cycling World Championships – Women's points race